Bianca Denisa Răzor (born 8 August 1994) is a Romanian sprinter who specializes in the 400 metres. She represented Romania at the 2012 Summer Olympics as well as two World Championships.

Competition record

Personal bests
Outdoor
200 metres – 23.35 (+0.9 m/s, Pitesti 2015)
400 metres – 50.37 (Beijing 2015)
Indoor
400 metres – 52.82 (Istanbul 2016)
800 metres – 2:03.65 (Glasgow 2019)

References

External links 
 
 
 
 

Sportspeople from Cluj-Napoca
1994 births
Living people
Romanian female sprinters
Athletes (track and field) at the 2012 Summer Olympics
Athletes (track and field) at the 2016 Summer Olympics
Olympic athletes of Romania
Athletes (track and field) at the 2010 Summer Youth Olympics
World Athletics Championships athletes for Romania
Universiade medalists in athletics (track and field)
Universiade bronze medalists for Romania
World Athletics Indoor Championships medalists
Medalists at the 2017 Summer Universiade
Olympic female sprinters